Bagnoli is a village in Tuscany, central Italy, administratively a frazione of the comune of Arcidosso, province of Grosseto, in the area of Mount Amiata. At the time of the 2001 census its population amounted to 359.

Bagnoli is about 58 km from Grosseto and just 1 km from Arcidosso. It is composed of several other wards and hamlets: Grappolini, Capannelle, Piane del Maturo, Canali, Capenti and Case Nuove.

Main sights 
 Church of Santa Mustiola, main church of the village, it was built in 12th century and restructured in 1885
 Chapel of Natività, old chapel in Canali hamlet
 Ancient woolen mill of Bagnoli
 Waterfall of Acqua d'Alto, a waterfall about 20 meters high

References

Bibliography 
 Agostino Morganti, La storia, il paese, la gente: Arcidosso e il suo territorio nelle cartoline degli anni 1900/1960, Arcidosso, C&P Adver Effigi, 2006.

See also 
 Le Macchie
 Montelaterone
 Salaiola
 San Lorenzo, Arcidosso
 Stribugliano
 Zancona

Frazioni of Arcidosso